Dunes Review is an online literary magazine based in northern Michigan. It is sponsored by both Michigan Writers of Grand Traverse County, Michigan and the Glen Arbor Art Association of Leelanau County, Michigan. The Beach Bards of Glen Arbor also contribute financially for the poetry prizes.

History
The Dunes Review Writing Project was launched in 1996 by local poet, playwright, and writing teacher, Anne-Marie Oomen. A key early focus of the magazine was on promoting regional writing and to raise consciousness about Northern Michigan writers. It also utilized art by local artists for its cover. It was originally sponsored by Glen Arbor Arts Association and the Traverse City Arts Council with the financial support of a mini-grant from the Michigan Council for the Arts and Cultural Affairs. Their first issue was published in the spring of 1997.

In 2002, there was a transition in management. The Glen Arbor Art Association began to share financial, advisory, and publication responsibilities with Michigan Writers (Traverse City). Today, the magazine focuses on the best local as well as regional and national writers.

Contributors
 Jim Daniels, poet and Brittingham Prize in Poetry recipient.
 Nancy Eimers, poet and Whiting Writers' Award recipient.
 Allison Leigh Peters, poet and University of Michigan Academy of American Poets Prize (undergrad) recipient.
 Jack Ridl, poet and Gary Gildner Award recipient.
 Teresa Scollon, poet and National Endowment for the Arts Grant for Literature recipient.
 Diane Seuss, poet and Juniper Prize recipient.
 Alison Swan, poet/essayist and Heekin Prize finalist.

Contests
The magazine has held four distinct contests:
 The "Anne-Marie Oomen Poetry Prize" (2003–2006), an annual contest held for high school students.
 The "Leelanau Poetry Prize" (1997–2001), an annual poetry contest.
 The "William J. Shaw Memorial Prize for Poetry" (1997–present), an annual contest named for a professor of the literary arts from Northwestern Michigan College.
 The "Youth Poetry Prize" (1997–2001), a poetry contest for poets under 18 years old.

Reviews
"A hearty appetite for literature can be sated with the latest Dunes Review journal and 2011 chapbooks by Denise R. Baker (poetry) and Joan Schmeichel (short fiction) — all published by Michigan Writers." --Glen Arbor Sun

References

External links
 

1996 establishments in Michigan
2016 disestablishments in Michigan
Biannual magazines published in the United States
Defunct literary magazines published in the United States
Magazines established in 1996
Magazines disestablished in 2016
Magazines published in Michigan
Online literary magazines published in the United States
Online magazines with defunct print editions
Poetry magazines published in the United States